The reset button technique (based on the idea of status quo ante) is a plot device that interrupts continuity in works of fiction. Simply put, use of a reset button device returns all characters and situations to the status quo they held before a major change of some sort was introduced. It is typically used in the middle of a program to "negate" some portion of what came before. Often used in science fiction television series, animated series, soap operas, and comic books, the device allows elaborate and dramatic changes to characters and the fictional universe that might otherwise invalidate the premise of the show with respect to future episodes' or issues' continuity. Writers may, for example, use the technique to allow the audience to experience the death of the lead character, which traditionally would not be possible without effectively ending the work.

One-off use

When this device is used in shows that do not use it regularly, its effective use depends on the audience being unaware of the continuity status until the moment when the intention to use the reset button technique is made clear.  This requires the show to cause successful suspension of disbelief in the audience while introducing plot developments that would seriously alter the future of the show, without revealing that continuity is or will be interrupted. It is frequently employed as a plot twist that effectively undoes all the happenings of the episode. Common uses of this technique draw liberally from science fiction and metaphysical ideas, perhaps explaining its widespread use in those genres.

Examples of the reset button technique include dream sequences, alternate-history flashbacks, parallel universes, "alternate realities", "alternate timelines", daydreams, time travel, and hallucinations. In one trope that uses this technique (typically in science fiction or fantasy), a character will find themselves in a situation that seems familiar, but during the episode, some things seem odd. Then one or more major events happen, such as the death of a lead character. By the end of the episode or story arc the character realizes that they have been placed in a copy of their normal surroundings, usually to try to obtain information from them, and that the mastermind behind the plan made a few mistakes in fashioning the copied environment.

Perhaps the most infamous example of the reset button technique is the 1986 season premiere of Dallas in which it is revealed that Bobby Ewing's death in the previous season was merely a dream in the mind of one of the characters. This was parodied in the "Da Boom" episode of Family Guy. In comics, the Spider-Man storyline Spider-Man: One More Day undid the marriage of Peter Parker and Mary Jane Watson, drawing criticism due to the continuity issues, with some critics even comparing it to Dallas.

However, used appropriately, it can be devastating in terms of its effect. Near the end of the series finale of Newhart, innkeeper Dick Loudon (portrayed by Bob Newhart) is struck on the head and knocked unconscious. The scene switches abruptly to Dr. Bob Hartley, the character Newhart portrayed in his earlier series The Bob Newhart Show, waking up in bed next to his wife Emily (portrayed by Suzanne Pleshette). Hartley describes the strange dream he has just had about running a Vermont inn, which Emily blames on the Japanese food he ate before going to bed. The entirety of Newhart is thus established to be part of Hartley's dream.

Use as a frequent plot device

In many series, the reset button trope is used as a standard, and frequently explicit, plot device. 

Implicit usage of the technique can be seen in episodic fiction, such as when the results of episodes regularly cause what would seem to be massive changes in the status of characters and their world; however, it is understood by the audience that subsequent episodes will not take into account such events. An example is South Park, in which the character of Kenny dies in almost every episode in early seasons, only to reappear in future episodes without explanation.

The Simpsons is one show that generally uses this technique, while occasionally introducing lasting continuity changes. Creator Matt Groening referred to this flexibility as a "rubber band reality".

Reset-button using shows sometimes, as a form of self-referential humor, point out their own use of the technique.

Alluding to the trope, the CBBC television series Hounded features a literal reset button that, at the end of each episode, rewinds the entire day's events back to the beginning.

Similar devices

In many episodic shows, sudden changes to a character's past or attributes are not examples of the reset button technique, but merely a lack of continuity. For instance, in early episodes of the popular Fox TV show House Dr. Wilson's character was explicitly stated to be Jewish. However, in later episodes, it was implied that he was not, such as in the episode "The Social Contract" when House tells Dr. Taub that he cannot hope to compete in racquetball against Dr. Wilson because "Wilson played tennis at his college team. And you are a Jew, you're not athletic."
  
In many adventure-oriented series, the characters are defined essentially by what they do and encounter in the course of their adventures. Character development is kept to a bare minimum in favor of action and adventure. In some long-running series, characters do not appear to age, but are instead revised to fit the times. Examples of this include cartoon characters such as Scooby-Doo, series film characters such as James Bond, and serial novel characters such as Mack Bolan and Nancy Drew.
 
Simple failure to maintain continuity is not the use of the reset button technique, although in some cases, such a failure can be considered a reboot. For instance, when the Superman films came out in the 1970s, the screenwriters largely ignored the decades-long comic book storyline and frequently contradicted previous "facts". For example, in the comic books, Krypton, Superman's home planet, had a climate similar to Earth's, but in the film series, it had an icy climate.

See also 
 Canon (fiction)
 Deus ex machina
 Retcon

References

Continuity (fiction)
Plot (narrative)